Maurice Kamto (born 15 February 1954 in Bafoussam) is a Cameroonian politician, professor and barrister. He is one of the founders of the Cameroon Renaissance Movement (MRC).
  
He was a member of the International Law Commission of the United Nations from 1999 to 2016. He was one of the two main agents, the other one being Professor Peter Ntamark in the Cameroonian delegation  that successfully led the negotiations to resolve the matter of Bakassi, a peninsula disputed with neighboring Nigeria. His decisive contribution helped him to be appointed as Minister-Delegate to the Minister of Justice in 2004. He resigned from the government in November 2011.

After resigning from the government, Kamto formed a new opposition party, the Cameroon Renaissance Movement (MRC). A kick-off meeting of his party merging multiple parties was prohibited by the government on 13 August 2012.

In the 2018 Cameroonian presidential election Kamto ran as presidential candidate for the MRC. Incumbent President Paul Biya is said to have won, in spite of a fiercely contested result process. Indeed, the entire country watched a strong defence from Kamto’s group of lawyers who pointed the partiality of The Supreme Court of Cameroon that is composed of Biya’s CPDM party members. Kamto was declared runner-up by the Court and said to have received 14 percent of the votes. Kamto challenged the official results and declared himself winner of the election. His supporters held small-scale protests since then.

On 26 January 2019, Maurice Kamto and 200 of his supporters were arrested,  and locked up in Kondengui maximum security prison in Yaounde, Cameroon. He was freed on 5 October 2019 along with other leaders of his party, a day after the end of the Major National Dialogue, following an official release by President Biya.

In October 2021, Maurice Kamto declared "I am not sure that waiting after Biya will lead to a change in Cameroon". He is perfectly bilingual. 

Living people
Candidates for President of Cameroon
International Law Commission officials
1954 births
People from Bafoussam
Cameroonian officials of the United Nations
Members of the International Law Commission